The Murdo State Bank, at 205 Main St. in Murdo, South Dakota, was built in 1920.  It was listed on the National Register of Historic Places in 2015.

The bank was organized in 1906.

References

Bank buildings on the National Register of Historic Places in South Dakota
Commercial buildings completed in 1920
National Register of Historic Places in Jones County, South Dakota